3β-Androstanediol, also known as 5α-androstane-3β,17β-diol, and sometimes shortened in the literature to 3β-diol, is an endogenous steroid hormone and a metabolite of androgens like dehydroepiandrosterone (DHEA) and dihydrotestosterone (DHT).

Biological activity
3β-Androstanediol is a selective, high-affinity agonist of the ERβ, and hence, an estrogen. In contrast to ERβ, 3β-androstanediol does not bind to the androgen receptor (AR). 3β-Androstanediol has been reported to also bind to ERα with low nanomolar affinity, with several-fold lower affinity relative to ERβ. It has approximately 3% and 7% of the affinity of estradiol at the ERα and ERβ, respectively. Unlike 3α-androstanediol, 3β-androstanediol does not bind to the GABAA receptor.

3β-Androstanediol may be the primary endogenous ligand of ERβ in the prostate gland, and as a result of activation of the ERβ, 3β-androstanediol has antiproliferative effects against prostate cancer cells. Through the ERβ, 3β-androstanediol positively regulates oxytocin neurons and signaling in the paraventricular nucleus of hypothalamus, and has been found to have antidepressant, anxiolytic, cognitive-enhancing, and stress-relieving effects via this action. Androgens, including testosterone and DHT, are known to downregulate the hypothalamic-pituitary-adrenal axis, and this has been found to be due in part or full to their conversion into 3β-androstanediol rather than to activation of the AR.

Biochemistry

3β-Androstanediol is a 5α-reduced and 17β-hydroxylated metabolite of dehydroepiandrosterone (DHEA) as well as a 3β-hydroxylated metabolite of DHT (and by extension of testosterone).

A determination of the circulating levels of 3β-androstanediol in humans found concentrations of 239 ± 76 pg/ml and 82 ± 45 pg/ml of the compound in normal male and female serum, respectively.

3β-Androstanediol shows high affinity for sex hormone-binding globulin (SHBG), similar to that of DHT.

Chemistry
3β-Androstanediol, also known as 5α-androstane-3β,17β-diol, is a naturally occurring androstane steroid and a structural analogue of DHT (5α-androstan-17β-ol-3-one). A notable epimer of 3β-androstanediol is 3α-androstanediol.

17α-Ethynyl-3β-androstanediol is a 17α-substituted derivative of 3β-androstanediol and is an estrogen similarly.

References

5α-Reduced steroid metabolites
Androstanes
Antidepressants
Anxiolytics
Estrogens
Human metabolites
Selective ERβ agonists